Day of Redemption may refer to:

Ephesians 4:30 ("And grieve not the holy Spirit of God, whereby ye are sealed unto the day of redemption." KJV)
Day of Redemption (film), 2013

See also
Redemption Day (disambiguation)